David Côté (born November 20, 1996) is a professional Canadian football placekicker for the Montreal Alouettes of the Canadian Football League (CFL).

Amateur career 
Before playing at the university level, Côté played at the high school level for Académie Saint-Louis as a receiver/kicker and at the "cégep" level for Campus Notre-Dame-de-Foy (CNDF) as a kicker. Côté then played U Sports football for the Laval Rouge et Or from 2017 to 2019. He was named a U Sports Second-team All-Canadian in 2018 after connecting on 19 of 23 field goal attempts and being successful on all 26 of his point-after-touchdown converts. He finished that season as a Vanier Cup champion after the Rouge et Or completed an undefeated season and were victorious over the Western Mustangs in the 54th Vanier Cup. In that game, Côté was successful on both field goal attempts and all four convert tries. He did not play in 2020 due to the cancellation of the 2020 U Sports football season and remained draft-eligible for the Canadian Football League in 2021.

Professional career 
Upon entering the 2021 CFL Draft, Côté was drafted in the fifth round, 45th overall, by the Montreal Alouettes and signed with the team on June 2, 2021. He beat fellow kickers Tyler Crapigna and Félix Ménard-Brière during training camp to win the job as the team's placekicker to open the season. He played in his first professional game on August 14, 2021, against the Edmonton Elks where he was successful on three of his four field goal attempts, with the lone miss coming from a bad snap from centre. He also handled the team's kickoffs where he had four kicks with a 64.8-yard average. Overall for the 2021 season, he played in 14 regular season games where he made 32 out of 39 field goal attempts and 32 of 34 conversions.

In 2022, Côté was successful on 44 of 51 field goal attempts and connected on a career-long 52 yard field goal on October 1, 2022, against the Elks.

References

External links
Montreal Alouettes bio

1996 births
Living people
Canadian football placekickers
Laval Rouge et Or football players
Montreal Alouettes players
Players of Canadian football from Quebec
Sportspeople from Quebec City